The over 200 Central–Eastern Oceanic languages form a branch of the Oceanic language family within the Austronesian languages.

Languages
Traditional classifications have posited a Remote Oceanic branch within this family, but this was abandoned in Lynch et al. (2002), as no defining features could be found for such a group of languages. 
Southeast Solomons
Southern Oceanic linkage (languages of New Caledonia and Vanuatu, such as Paicî)
Central Pacific (Polynesian and the indigenous Austronesian languages of Fiji)
Micronesian

In 2007 Ross & Næss moved the Utupua-Vanikoro languages from Central-Eastern to the newly established Temotu branch of Oceanic.

See also
Remote Oceanic languages

References
Lynch, John, Malcolm Ross & Terry Crowley. (2002). The Oceanic languages. Richmond, Surrey: Curzon Press.

 
Languages of Oceania
Oceanic languages